Žilinskas is the masculine form of a Lithuanian family name. Its feminine forms  are: Žilinskienė (married woman or widow) and Žilinskaitė (unmarried woman). It is a Lithuanized form of the Polish-language surname  Żyliński. Another Lithuanization is Žilinskis. "Žilinskaitė" may be transliterated via Russian language as Zhilinskayte.

Notable people with this surname include:
Egidijus Žilinskas, Lithuanian judoka
 (1893–1948), Lithuanian actor, former director of Kaunas State Drama Theatre
Annette Zilinskas, American musician 
Jurga Žilinskienė MBE, (born 1976), British Lithuanian entrepreneur 
Nelė Žilinskienė, Lithuanian high jumper
Victoria Zhilinskayte (born 1989), Russian handball player 
Vytautė Žilinskaitė, Lithuanian writer
Yana Zhilinskayte (born 1989), Russian handball player

Lithuanian-language surnames

lt:Žilinskas